Cyrano de Bergerac is a Franco-Italian silent romantic drama film directed by Augusto Genina in 1922 based on the 1897 play of the same name by Edmond Rostand. Genina began filming in 1922, at age 30, with the help of his cousin Mario Camerini, but its release was delayed by the colorization of the film.

Plot
As described in a film magazine reviews, Cyrano , a Frenchman celebrated as a hero, poet, and soldier, wins fear and respect because of his swordsmanship. Because of his sensitiveness of his huge nose, he keeps himself from society. He believes he is outcast from romance. When he falls in love with a young woman, Roxanne, he courts her by proxy. At last she realizes Cyrano's feelings for her. Before she has an opportunity to talk to him, he dies a death of glory.

Cast

Production
Nearly the entire film was colored using the Pathé Stencil Color process, which took three years to complete, delaying the film's release until 1925. This involved cutting stencils for each frame of the film, one for each of up to four colors. This was done in Paris by Mme. Marie-Berthe Thuillier, the most famous stencil-color artist, by projecting each frame onto a ground glass screen, and tracing with a Pantograph. These stencils were then used to apply colors to black-and-white prints in a process similar to silk-screening. Each shot was processed separately, so different color palettes could be used for each shot.

References

External links
 
 
 
 Cyrano de Bergerac (1925): A Silent Film Review
 
 

1920s color films
Films based on Cyrano de Bergerac (play)
French silent feature films
1925 drama films
1925 films
Italian silent feature films
Silent films in color
French drama films
Italian drama films
Early color films
Silent drama films
1920s French films
1920s Italian films